Sokratis Ofrydopoulos (born 26 October 1973) is a Greek professional football manager and former player, who is the current manager of Super League 2 club AEK Athens B.

References

1973 births
Living people
Kallithea F.C. players
Ionikos F.C. players
PAS Giannina F.C. players
Asteras Tripolis F.C. players
Greece under-21 international footballers
Greek football managers
Panachaiki F.C. managers
Doxa Drama F.C. managers
Association football defenders
Footballers from Athens
Greek footballers